Enric Rabassa Llompart (19 April 1920 – 29 December 1980) was a Spanish football player and coach best known for winning the 1960 Inter-Cities Fairs Cup with FC Barcelona.

References

1920 births
1980 deaths
Footballers from Barcelona
Spanish footballers
UE Sants players
CF Badalona players
Spanish football managers
La Liga managers
Segunda División managers
FC Barcelona managers
CD Condal managers
CD Tenerife managers
Deportivo de La Coruña managers
CE L'Hospitalet managers
CD Atlético Baleares managers
CF Reus Deportiu managers
Association footballers not categorized by position